This is a list of flags that are used exclusively in Occitanie. Other flags used in Occitania, as well as the rest of France can be found at list of French flags.

National minority flags

Regional flags

Departmental flags

Historical flags

See also
List of French flags

Footnotes
 Registered at the French Society of Vexillology.

References

Occitania